Mihal "Mike" Lazaridis  (born March 14, 1961) is a Canadian businessman, investor in quantum computing technologies, and founder of BlackBerry, which created and manufactured the BlackBerry wireless handheld device. With an estimated net worth of US$800 million (as of June 2011), Lazaridis was ranked by Forbes as the 17th wealthiest Canadian and 651st in the world.

Lazaridis served in various positions including co-chairman and co-CEO of BlackBerry from 1984 to 2012 and Board Vice Chair and Chair of the Innovation Committee from 2012 to 2013. As a passionate advocate for the power of basic science to improve and transform the world, he co-founded Quantum Valley Investments in March 2013 with childhood friend and BlackBerry co-founder Douglas Fregin to provide financial and intellectual capital for the further development and commercialization of breakthroughs in quantum information science. In 1999 he founded the Perimeter Institute for Theoretical Physics, where he also serves as board chair. In 2002, he founded the Institute for Quantum Computing. He is also a former chancellor of the University of Waterloo, and an Officer of the Order of Canada.

Personal, education, and career history 
Lazaridis was born in Istanbul, Turkey, to Pontic Greek parents, Nick and Dorothy Lazaridis with original lineage to the island of Chios. He was five years old when his family moved to Canada in 1966, settling in Windsor, Ontario. At age 12, he won a prize at the Windsor Public Library for reading every science book in the library.

In 1979, he enrolled at the University of Waterloo in electrical engineering with an option in computer science. In 1984, Lazaridis responded to a request for proposal from General Motors (GM) to develop a network computer control display system. GM awarded him a contract. He dropped out of university that year, just two months before he was scheduled to graduate. The GM contract, a small government grant, and a loan from Lazaridis's parents enabled Lazaridis, Mike Barnstijn, and Douglas Fregin to launch Research In Motion. One of the company's first achievements was the development of barcode technology for film. RIM plowed the profits from that into wireless data transmission research, eventually leading to the introduction of the BlackBerry wireless mobile device in 1999, and its better-known version in 2002.

Lazaridis and his wife Ophelia have also been noted for their philanthropic work in the Waterloo area.

Philanthropy 
In 2000, Lazaridis founded and donated more than $170 million to the Perimeter Institute for Theoretical Physics. He and his wife Ophelia founded and donated more than $100 million to the Institute for Quantum Computing at the University of Waterloo in 2002. In 2015, Lazaridis donated $20 million to Wilfrid Laurier University for a new technology-focused management institute at the business school, which was renamed in his honour as the Lazaridis School of Business & Economics.

Awards and honours 
On October 21, 1999, Lazaridis received an honorary doctor of engineering degree from the University of Waterloo, and in June 2003, he became its eighth chancellor. He was listed on Maclean's Honour Roll as a distinguished Canadian in 2000 and named Canada's Nation Builder of the Year for 2002 by readers of The Globe and Mail newspaper. In 2006, he was made an Officer of the Order of Canada and a member of the Order of Ontario. In 2014 he was elected a Fellow of the Royal Society. His nomination reads:Father of what has become known as the smartphone, Mike Lazaridis is recognized in the global wireless community as a visionary, innovator and engineer of extraordinary talent. He is the founder of RIM and the creator of the BlackBerry. Since 1999, he has made the primary donations establishing the Perimeter Institute for Theoretical Physics, the Institute for Quantum Computing (IQC) and the University of Waterloo Quantum-Nano Centre. The Perimeter Institute has already become an international beacon for theoretical physics and IQC is widely regarded as the leading centre of quantum information science worldwide. Together, these institutes have transformed physics in Canada and made a major impact internationally.Lazaridis received an Academy Award in 1999 for technical achievements relating to the creation of a high-speed barcode reader used in film editing. The same invention received an Emmy in 1994.

Lazaridis is portrayed in the 2023 film BlackBerry by Jay Baruchel.

See also 
 List of Canadians by net worth
 List of University of Waterloo people

References

External links 
 
 
 PM Paul Martin Speech
 Acceptance Speech
 2012 AAAS Annual Conference Plenary Speech in Vancouver, BC
 The BIrth of the BlackBerry

1961 births
Canadian billionaires
Canadian Fellows of the Royal Society
Businesspeople from Ontario
Canadian philanthropists
Chancellors of the University of Waterloo
Canadian people of Greek descent
Living people
Members of the Order of Ontario
Officers of the Order of Canada
Turkish emigrants to Canada
Constantinopolitan Greeks
People from Waterloo, Ontario
People from Windsor, Ontario
Directors of BlackBerry Limited
Canadian technology company founders
Canadian chairpersons of corporations
Intelligent Community Forum
Academy Award for Technical Achievement winners
Businesspeople from Istanbul